Blues Alley, founded in 1965, is a jazz nightclub in the Georgetown neighborhood of Washington, D.C.

Musicians who have performed at Blues Alley include John Abercrombie, Monty Alexander, Mose Allison, Tony Bennett, Rory Block, Ruby Braff, Gary Burton, Charlie Byrd, Eva Cassidy, Mel Clement, Buck Clayton, Billy Cobham, Larry Coryell, Roy Eldridge, Maynard Ferguson, Rachelle Ferrell, Ella Fitzgerald, Kenny Garrett, Stan Getz, Dizzy Gillespie, Bobby Hackett, Billy Butterfield, Roland Hanna, Clancy Hayes, Buck Hill, Earl Hines, Freddie Hubbard, Lurlean Hunter, Phyllis Hyman, Ahmad Jamal, Dr John, Stanley Jordan, Steve Jordan, Stacey Kent, Ramsey Lewis, Les McCann, Taj Mahal, Pat Martino, Wynton Marsalis, Pat Metheny, Charles Mingus, Mark Murphy, Jaco Pastorius, Oscar Peterson, Joshua Redman,  Max Roach, Sonny Rollins, Jimmy Rushing, Gil Scott-Heron, Charlie Shavers, George Shearing, Wayne Shorter, Maxine Sullivan, Ralph Towner, Stanley Turrentine, McCoy Tyner, Sarah Vaughan, Grover Washington Jr., Mary Wilson, Nancy Wilson, Teddy Wilson and Sol Yaged. 

Musicians who have recorded a Live at Blues Alley album include Eva Cassidy, Dizzy Gillespie (featuring local tenor saxophonist Ron Holloway), Ahmad Jamal, Ramsey Lewis, Wynton Marsalis, Pat Martino, Max Roach, Stanley Turrentine, and Grover Washington Jr.

In 1975, during afternoons when the club was closed, Earl Hines spent a week in Blues Alley making an hourlong film for British television, featuring Frank Hart, Blue's Alley's "clean-up man".

Blues Alley also has a non-profit jazz arm, the Blues Alley Jazz Society, dedicated to jazz education and outreach for young performers in the local area. Education and outreach programs include the Blues Alley Youth Orchestra and Blues Alley Jazz Summer Camp.

See also
 List of jazz venues

References

External links

Blues Alley - Official website

Blues Alley  Documentary produced by WETA-TV

Nightclubs in Washington, D.C.
Music venues in Washington, D.C.
1965 establishments in Washington, D.C.
Jazz clubs in the United States
Music venues completed in 1965
Georgetown (Washington, D.C.)